Into the Sun may refer to:

Fiction 
 Into the Sun (1992 film), an American action comedy starring Michael Paré and Anthony Michael Hall
 Into the Sun (2005 film), an American/Japanese action film starring Steven Seagal
 Into the Sun & Other Stories, a 1980 short-story collection by Robert Duncan Milne

Music

Albums 
 Into the Sun (Bassnectar album), 2015
 Into the Sun (Candlebox album), 2008
 Into the Sun (Randy Brecker album), 1997
 Into the Sun (Sean Lennon album), 1998
 Into the Sun (Robben Ford album), 2015

Songs 
 "Into the Sun" (Tarja song), 2012
 "Into the Sun", by Candlebox from Into the Sun
 "Into the Sun", by Grand Funk Railroad from On Time
 "Into the Sun", by Jann Arden from Blood Red Cherry
 "Into the Sun", by Lifehouse from the self-titled album
 "Into the Sun", by the Static Jacks from If You're Young